Yaboot (yet another boot loader) is a bootloader for PowerPC-based hardware running Linux.

History 
In 2009, maintenance by Paul Nasrat was handed over to Tony Breeds.

Hardware support 
Support includes the New World ROM Macintosh and IBM RS/6000 systems. It does not support the "OldWorld" PowerMacs.

Booting procedure 
It is built to run within the Open Firmware layer common to most such systems instead of working as a Mac OS 9 program like its predecessor BootX.

Yaboot is similar to LILO and GNU GRUB. Yaboot uses the following steps to boot:

 Yaboot is invoked by Open Firmware
 Finds a boot device, boot path and opens boot partition
 Opens /etc/yaboot.conf or a command shell
 Loads image or kernel and initrd
 Executes image

See also 
 Comparison of boot loaders

References

External links 

 Former official website on the Wayback Machine

Free boot loaders